Kokomo is a city in Indiana and the county seat of Howard County, Indiana, United States.  Its population increased from 45,468 at the 2010 census to 59,604 in the 2020 census.  It is the principal city of the Kokomo, Indiana Metropolitan Statistical Area, which includes all of Howard County, the Kokomo-Peru CSA, which includes Howard and Miami counties, as well as the North Central Indiana region  consisting of six counties anchored by the city of Kokomo. 

Named for the Miami Ma-Ko-Ko-Mo who was called "Chief Kokomo", Kokomo first benefited from the legal business associated with being the county seat. Before the Civil War, it was connected with Indianapolis and then the Eastern cities by railroad, which resulted in sustained growth. Substantial growth came after the discovery of large natural gas reserves, which produced an economic boom in the mid-1880s. Among the businesses which the boom attracted was the fledgling automobile industry. A significant number of technical and engineering innovations were developed in Kokomo, particularly in automobile production, and, as a result, Kokomo became known as the "City of Firsts." A substantial portion of Kokomo's employment still depends on the automobile industry.

History

Early history and incorporation
The city of Kokomo was named after the Miami man Ma-Ko-Ko-Mo, said to have been one of the four sons of Chief Richardville, last of the chiefs of the Miami people. Tradition holds that David Foster, the "Father of Kokomo," named the town Kokomo after the "ornriest Indian on earth" because Kokomo was "the ornriest town on earth." Kokomo is thought to have been born in 1775 and died in 1838. The only documentary proof of his existence is a trading post record of a purchase of a barrel of flour for $12 for his "squaw." His remains (with those of others) were reportedly discovered during the construction of a saw mill in 1848 and re-interred in the "north-east corner" of the Pioneer Cemetery. The tradition of the Peru Miami is that the town was named after a Thorntown Miami named Ko-kah-mah, whose name is rendered Co-come-wah in the Treaty at the Forks of the Wabash in 1834. That name was translated as "the diver" (an animal that could swim under water).

As a result of various removals, by 1840 the Miami population in Howard County (until 1846 known as Richardville County) was reduced to about 200. The principal settlement was the Village of Kokomo, on the south side of Wildcat Creek. Indian paths connected Kokomo with Frankfort and Thorntown (along the Wildcat) and led to Peru by way of Cassville, and to Meshingomesia by way of Greentown. At the time David Foster had a trading post in Howard County, near the intersection of the reservation boundary line and Wildcat pike, where he engaged in both legitimate trade and illegal sale of alcohol to the Miamis on government property.

Shortly after Richardville County was organized in 1844 the commissioners appointed to establish the county seat approached Foster for a donation from his substantial holdings. (In 1846 tax records show that he owned  of farmland and as well as 67 divided lots in the business district.) At the time of the request the only improvements in what is now Kokomo were Foster's log house and log barn and several Miami huts. The terms of the donation required that Foster build a courthouse on the land, but he was later excused and Rufus L. Blowers was promised $28 to build it. He was penalized $2 for construction delays. The log courthouse was completed in 1845.

In June 1855, Henry A. Brouse petitioned the board of Howard county commissioners to incorporate the town of Kokomo. The original election was not held (for unspecified reasons), but another took place on October 1, 1855. After a vote of 62–3 in favor of incorporation, the board so ordered it.

On March 31, 1865, an election was held for Kokomo to assume a city government. The resolution was passed, and Nelson Purdum was elected the first mayor.

Early growth
In anticipation of business that the court would bring, Kokomo began a fairly quick growth from the time that lots were first sold on October 18, 1844. David Foster was granted the first license to sell merchandise in Kokomo at the December 1844 commissioners meeting. Two more merchants were licensed in March 1845. John Bohan, who would become a major shop owner, merchant, justice of the peace and investor, moved to Kokomo in December 1844, and erected the first two-story frame house, not only in Kokomo, but in all the county.

After the enactment of the 1846 pre-emption law, settlers rapidly attempted to secure homesteads in the surrounding lands.

By 1850 Kokomo had a newspaper, when James Beard purchased the printing equipment of the New London Pioneer and set up the Howard Tribune. By 1851 county business was so brisk that the county ordered the construction of two more court buildings, both one story brick affairs, . The county auditor and treasurer occupied one building, and the clerk and recorder occupied the other.

On April 1, 1854, Kokomo's first bank, the Indian Reserve Bank, was organized with David Foster, John Bohan and Harless Ashly the principal shareholders. (It only lasted a few years until a robbery impaired its capital. The loss substantially injured Foster's fortune.)

Railroads
1854 saw the first railroad stop at Kokomo. The New London Pioneer had long advocated for a rail line to connect Kokomo with Indianapolis. Colonel C.D. Murray was the agent at Kokomo for stock subscriptions in support of the railroad. In 1852 the construction of the Peru and Indianapolis Railroad commenced. In Kokomo Samuel C. Mills and Dr. Corydon Richmond, commercial competitors of David Foster, donated several lots to the railroad in order to secure the location of the rail depot near their commercial property. The route was laid along Buckeye Street at the insistence of the merchants who hoped to reduced drayage expenses. Samuel Mills built a large frame structure at the Howard flouring mills, which served as a warehouse for the company's freight and a passenger depot. For some time after 1854 Kokomo was the terminus of the line, but eventually the line was extended to Peru and then to Michigan City.

A short time after the construction of the Peru and Indianapolis Railroad began, the Pennsylvania Railroad announced that one of its lines would pass through Kokomo. By 1853 a line was commenced between Kokomo and Logansport (which was intended to become the hub of a network of lines for the company). Railroad service was inaugurated on that line on July 4, 1855.

The most important rail line for Kokomo became the standard-gauge Clover Leaf line. This railroad would eventually link Kokomo with both the West Coast and the Eastern Seaboard. It began as a short line linking Frankfort and Kokomo, the Frankfort and Kokomo Railroad. Henry Y. Morrison of Frankfort was the principal promoter, and A.Y. Comstock acted for him in Kokomo. A failure of the proposed subsidy caused the promoters to turn all assets over to the contractors, who promised to complete the line. Construction began in 1873 and was completed the following year. Limited freight between the two cities made the line unprofitable. After a series of acquisitions by other railroads, the line became part of the Toledo, St. Louis and Kansas City Railroad. A line connecting it to the east reached Kokomo on January 1, 1881.

Mayor Cole
In 1881, one of the most remarkable and controversial events in Kokomo's history took place. Mayor Henry C. Cole was shot to death by a sheriff's posse. Dr. Cole had a curious history and had stirred up a great deal of passion in the previous fifteen years. He was reputed to have been a gifted surgeon, who served in the Union Army during the Civil War and when afterwards he settled in Kokomo, he became a prominent physician. In Kokomo he married a woman, Natalie Cole, of whom he became intensely jealous. He became suspicious of one Allen, whom he warned away from Kokomo. When he discovered Allen leaving the post office one day in October 1866, he shot him dead. The fact that the killing both took place in broad daylight and showed cold-blooded rage (Cole continued shooting after Allen was down) caused the crime to receive national attention. Cole's case was venued to Tipton County, where he retained Daniel W. Voorhees of Terre Haute to represent him. Voorhees obtained a not guilty verdict on a plea of emotional insanity. Cole divorced his wife thereafter.

Cole's reputation for violent instability, and the cowardice in the way he killed Allen, created many enemies for him, but his generosity toward poor patients and a promise to "clean up" the town won him enough support to win a bitter election for Mayor in 1881. Shortly thereafter, on September 19, 1881, he was shot dead by a sheriff's posse at Old Spring Mills at West Jefferson Street. According to the coroner's inquest, he died from shotgun wounds inflicted by Deputy George Bennett (father of New York stage idol Richard Bennett). The sheriff claimed that an informant had advised him that Cole was planning to rob a flour mill, possibly to incriminate his enemies. The posse was forced to fire on Cole in self-defense (the sheriff claimed he had two revolvers) and to prevent his escape, although his injuries seemed inconsistent with that version. Cole's supporter's argued that no revolvers or burglary tools were produced and that the motive was implausible. Nevertheless, no action was taken against Bennett or the other members of the posse.

Natural gas boom
Natural gas had been developed in Pennsylvania and Canada for some time, and had most recently been developed around Findlay, Ohio. It took until September to obtain the necessary 22 subscribers. The first rig was built south of Wildcat Creek. and on October 6, 1886, natural gas erupted forth and the well was capped.

Together with the well in Eaton, which began producing slightly before Kokomo's, the discovery led to the Indiana Gas Boom. This discovery was directly responsible for Elwood Haynes' move to Kokomo, as a superintendent with a gas company with interests in Kokomo and Howard County. The Diamond Plate Glass Company (now part of PPG Industries) began in Kokomo in 1887, lured by the cheap and plentiful natural gas. The Kokomo Opalescent Glass Works started making stained glass in Kokomo in 1888 and has been in continuous operation ever since.

"City of Firsts"

As a result of the natural gas boom, Kokomo attracted an increasing number of industries, which resulted in significant technological innovations. For these industrial and technical achievements, Kokomo is officially known as the "City of Firsts." Among other achievements, Kokomo was a pioneer of the United States automobile manufacturing, with Elwood Haynes test-driving his early internal combustion engine auto there on July 4, 1894. Haynes and his associates built a number of other autos over the next few years; the Haynes-Apperson Automobile Company for mass-production of commercial autos was established in Kokomo in 1898. Haynes went on to invent Stainless Steel flatware in 1912 to give his wife tarnish-free dinnerware. In 1938, the Delco Radio Division of General Motors (now Aptiv) developed the first push button car radio.

Kokomo serves as the "City of Firsts" in the food industry as well. In 1928 Walter Kemp, Kemp Brothers Canning Co. developed the first canned tomato juice because of a request by a physician in search for baby food for his clinic. Kokomo is also home to the first mechanical corn picker which was developed by John Powell in the early 1920s. Kokomo was home to the first Ponderosa Steakhouse, which opened in 1965. Kokomo opened the first McDonald's with a diner inside, locally called "McDiner." This McDonald's theme failed nationally. Eventually, the "McDiner" closed and was converted back to a regular McDonald's restaurant.

The following inventions are associated with Kokomo:
 1894 – Elwood Haynes makes the first successful trial run of his "horseless carriage" on Pumpkinvine Pike, which is now Boulevard east of Indiana 931 (formerly U.S.31.)
 1894 – The first pneumatic rubber tire in the US was created by D.C. Spraker at the Kokomo Rubber Tire Company.
 1895 – The first aluminum casting was developed by William "Billy" Johnson from the Ford and Donnelly Foundry.
 1902 – Kingston carburetor developed by George Kingston.
 1906 – The first Stellite cobalt-base alloy was discovered by Elwood Haynes.
 1912 – Stainless steel tableware was invented by Elwood Haynes as a response to his wife's desire for tableware that wouldn't tarnish.
 1918 – The Howitzer shell, used in World War I, was created by the Superior Machine Tool Company.
 1918 – The first aerial bomb with fins was produced by the Liberty Pressed Metal Company.
 1920 – The mechanical corn picker was created by John Powell.
 1923 – William Swern Sr. developed the first tire-building machine for mass production of auto tires 
 1928 – The first canned tomato juice was created by Walter Kemp from Kemp Brothers Canning Company in response to a physician's need for baby food.
 1938 – The first push-button car radio was created at Delco Radio Division of General Motors Corporation.
 1941 – Globe American Stove Company manufactured the first all-metal life boats and rafts, known as Kokomo Kids in the US Navy.
 1947 – The first signal-seeking car radio was created by the Delco Radio Division of General Motors.
 1956 – Delco Radio Division of General Motors produced a transistorized signal-seeking car (hybrid) radio, which used both vacuum tubes and transistors in its radio's circuitry. This transistorized car radio was available as an option on the 1956 Chevrolet Corvette car models.
 1957 – Delco Radio Division of General Motors produced an all-transistor car radio, as standard equipment for the Cadillac Eldorado Brougham car model.

1913 Flood
On March 21–26, 1913 Kokomo suffered severe flooding when  of rainfall occurred. Damage was widespread, including loss of electrical power due to the power plant being flooded. On March 26, flooding was declared over after the water level dropped  in a 24-hour period.<ref>"The Great Flood of 1913" The Kokomo Tribune, March 25, 2013</ref>

 Continental Steel Corporation 
From 1914 through 1986, the Continental Steel Corporation facility produced nails, wire and wire fence from scrap steel on a  facility in Kokomo. Manufacturing operations in the steel plant and on other portions of the property included the use, handling, storage and disposal of hazardous materials. Steel-making operations had included reheating, casting rolling, drawing, pickling, galvanizing, tinning and tempering.

After the company filed for bankruptcy in 1986, EPA and the Indiana Department of Environmental Management investigated the plant and property and found soil, sediments, surface water and ground water contaminated with volatile organic compounds (PCBs) and several metals, including lead, arsenic, cadmium, and chromium. Lead contamination was also detected in soils on nearby residential properties.

The site was proposed to the National Priorities List as a Superfund site in 1988 and formally added in 1989.

In April 2009, EPA received almost $6 million in American Recovery and Reinvestment Act to complete needed cleanup at two problems at the Continental Steel Superfund site: the former Slag Processing Area and the site's contaminated ground water. The ARRA funding helped accelerate the cleanup of hazardous waste on the site. In the process, total of 15 Indiana contractors or subcontractors were involved in the ARRA-funded work, creating at least 45 temporary jobs.

In August 2010, using the ARRA funds, EPA completed the cleanup of the former slag processing area of the Superfund Site. Approximately  of slag were moved to the site's acid lagoon area for use as fill on that portion of the site.  of clean soil were used to cap the former slag processing area, leaving it suitable for potential redevelopment. ARRA funds were also used to address contaminated groundwater at the site. This work included extensive groundwater sampling to determine the contaminated plume area and installation of groundwater extraction and monitoring wells. Three wind turbines will be used to generate much of the power needed to operate the groundwater extraction system.

Site cleanup was completed in August 2011.

In 2016 the former site was approved as the location of a Solar farm with installation of panels beginning in August 2016. The estimated cost of the project is $10M.
The solar energy park began operating on December 29, 2016.

Ku Klux Klan
In the summer of 1923, record numbers attended rallies of the Ku Klux Klan in Indiana. On June 16, 1923, a crowd of 75,000 attended a Klan rally in Terre Haute. On June 21 Argos held the largest rally it had ever seen. On June 26 a large Klan rally was held in Alexandria. All of this was merely a prelude to the rally planned for Kokomo. Conceived as a "monster tristate conclave," it was intended to charter 93 Indiana klans representing more than 300,000 members. Some doubted the prospect of 200,000 attendees, claiming it would be "without parallel in history"; others predicted attendance of 300,000. Extensive preparations for that number were made, including the scheduling of 1,000 interurban cars from around Indiana to Kokomo. The Union Traction Company, in addition to supplying 50 cars, transported three cars of white horses to Kokomo for the parade. The Kokomo Klan rented the fields surrounding its own large lot for parking, and electric amplifiers were obtained to allow the large crowd to hear the speeches.

According to historian Robert Coughlan, "literally half" of Kokomo residents were members of the Ku Klux Klan during its height in the 1920s and 1930s. On July 4, 1923, Kokomo achieved national notoriety when it hosted the largest Ku Klux Klan gathering in history. An estimated 200,000 Klan members and supporters gathered in Malfalfa Park for a massive Konklave in which D. C. Stephenson was elevated to the position of Grand Dragon of the Indiana Klan. Other estimates say the crowd was only 10,000. A huge flag was used that day to collect a reported $50,000 for construction of a local "Klan hospital" so that Klan members would not have to be treated at the only local hospital, which was Catholic. Both men's and women's Klans held weekly rallies and initiations in Malfalfa Park, and Kokomo's Klanswomen held meetings at the armory, the local headquarters of the Women of the Ku Klux Klan, and churches. A speech at a Baptist church was attended by 1,000 Klanswomen.

The Kokomo rally sent shockwaves through the national GOP, which had come to believe that the re-election of President Warren G. Harding depended on the vote of Indiana. According to the Washington correspondent of the New York World, Republicans feared that the Klan had "obliterated party lines" and "virtually swallowed" the Indiana Republican Party. Since the Republicans held only a 25,000 vote plurality in the state, any serious defection of African-Americans would tip the state to the Democrats. In the event, Harding died within a month and Republican Calvin Coolidge succeeded him with a substantial electoral majority (including Indiana) against a divided opposition. The Klan, however, continued to dominate state politics especially after the election of Edward L. Jackson as governor.

Ryan White

Kokomo served to symbolize the nation's early misunderstanding and ignorance of AIDS in the mid-to-late 1980s when Ryan White was expelled from school due to his illness. White was a teenage hemophiliac who had been infected with HIV through contaminated blood products (Factor 8). At the time blood products were often collected through state prison systems. Factor 8 was made from pooled plasma of thousands of donors. Later the plasma was screened for HIV and Hepatitis and heat treated to inactive HIV and Hepatitis. The teen had been attending Western Middle School (which is actually in Russiaville) but was ostracized by his classmates, and forced to eat lunch alone and use a separate restroom. Many parents and teachers in Kokomo rallied in support of banning White from attending the school. A lengthy administrative appeal process with the school system ensued, followed by death threats and violence against White and his family, including a bullet being fired through the window of their Kokomo home. Media coverage of the case made White into a national celebrity and spokesman for AIDS research and public education. In 1987, the White family left Kokomo for Cicero, Indiana. Ryan attended Hamilton Heights High School in nearby Arcadia, where he was welcomed by faculty and students.

Gas tower
The Kokomo Gas Tower had been a symbol of Kokomo since it was constructed in 1954. Due to high maintenance costs of $75,000 a year, and up to $1,000,000 to paint it, the gas company decided to demolish it in 2003. Other ideas were reviewed before settling on this decision, including a plan to turn the tower into a giant Coca-Cola advertisement. On September 7, 2003, at approximately 7:30 a.m., the Gas Tower was demolished by Controlled Demolition, Inc. (CDI). Pieces of the tower were sold to the public for $20–$30, and proceeds went to a planned Kokomo technology incubation center and Bona Vista.

Significant tornadoes
1965 tornado

On April 11, 1965, the southern part of Kokomo was struck by one of the 47 tornadoes that erupted over six Midwestern states, an event now known as the Palm Sunday outbreak. Significant damage was done to the Chrysler transmission plant. Windows were broken and the framework cracked throughout, and sections of the west wall were leveled. The Maple Crest elementary and junior high schools suffered extensive damage. The roof collapsed on the junior high school, and the framework of both schools was substantially wrecked. The Maple Crest Shell Station at the intersection of Lincoln and Washington was torn from its foundation and scattered about. Mills Drug Store at the same intersection was demolished. A house on Holly Lane was uprooted, and one on James Drive was demolished. The Maple Crest Shopping Center was extensively damaged, with Woolworth's suffering the most damage. The front and back of the one-story structure were caved in and merchandise was strewn about. Numerous homes in the Maple Crest area were flattened, and the top floor of the Maple Crest apartments was blown off. The only thing left standing on the nearby Church of the Brethren was the steeple. The force of the wind on the flat earth near Kokomo was so great that Ted Fujita was able to make aerial photographs of the spiral scoring on the ground.

2016 tornado

On August 24, 2016, a strong EF3 tornado caused major damage in the southern part of Kokomo. 1,000 homes were damaged, 170 of which sustained major damage. 80 of these homes were destroyed, some sustaining loss of roofs and exterior walls. Many large trees and power poles were snapped along the path, and the Park Place Apartments were heavily damaged as well. Vehicles were also damaged, including a large truck that was moved 10 feet from the driveway of a house and flipped over. A Starbucks was completely destroyed, and several people were left trapped inside the still standing bathroom and had to be rescued. Many sheds and detached garages were destroyed as well, and a receipt from Kokomo was found 30 miles away in Marion. The storm followed a path very close to that of another tornado which hit on November 17, 2013. Scientists have noticed that nearly every tornado in Kokomo has struck the southern part of the city.

Geography and climate

Kokomo has a humid continental climate (Köppen Dfa).

 Notable tornadoes 
Kokomo has been struck by 18 tornadoes between 1950 and 2015, some of which were strong enough to claim lives.

On March 6, 1961, two F3 tornadoes struck the southern part of Kokomo, killing one person and injuring three others.

On April 11, 1965, an F4 tornado tore through portions of Russiaville, Alto, southern Kokomo, and Greentown killing 25 people and injuring hundreds of more.

On April 20, 2004, Two tornadoes struck the Northern part of Kokomo. The first tornado was rated F0 and caused little damage to homes and trees. The second tornado was rated F1 and caused a roof to collapse at the local skating rink, and damaged three other homes and a truck stop. Both tornadoes caused 1 injury and no fatalities. This was the first time ever a tornado has struck the Northern part of Kokomo.

On November 17, 2013, two EF2 tornadoes tore through the southern part of Kokomo. The first tornado Damaged over 300 homes/businesses. The second tornado touched down briefly and caused damage to the local golf course and other businesses. In all, The two tornadoes caused 0 fatalities and only five injuries.

Main #2016 tornado

On August 24, 2016, an EF3 tornado caused significant damage to the Southern part of Kokomo damaging over 1,000 homes and businesses. 80 of these homes were destroyed, 176 had their walls blown in and roofs torn off, and over 700 were damaged badly. No fatal injuries were recorded during this tornado.

Demographics

Kokomo is the larger principal city of the Kokomo-Peru CSA, a Combined Statistical Area that includes the Kokomo metropolitan area (Howard and Tipton counties) and the Peru micropolitan area (Miami County).MICROPOLITAN STATISTICAL AREAS AND COMPONENTS , Office of Management and Budget, May 11, 2007. Accessed 2008-08-01. The three counties had a total population of 133,061 in 2018, however the Kokomo-Peru CSA listed population of 117,933  suggest that Tipton County was dropped from the Kokomo MSA by the US Census Bureau.

As of 2000 the median income for households in the city was $36,258, and the median income for a family was $45,353. Males had a median income of $38,420 versus $24,868 for females. The per capita income for the city was $20,083. About 9.6% of families and 13.0% of the population were below the poverty line, including 18.5% of those under age 18 and 9.3% of those age 65 or over.

2010 census
As of the census of 2010, there were 45,468 people, 19,848 households, and 11,667 families residing in the city. The racial makeup of the city was 83.5% White, 10.7% African American, 0.4% Native American, 1.0% Asian, 1.1% from other races, and 3.3% from two or more races. Hispanic or Latino of any race were 3.3% of the population.

There were 19,848 households, of which 30.0% had children under the age of 18 living with them, 37.4% were married couples living together, 16.6% had a female householder with no husband present, 4.8% had a male householder with no wife present, and 41.2% were non-families. 35.4% of all households were made up of individuals, and 13.2% had someone living alone who was 65 years of age or older. The average household size was 2.25 and the average family size was 2.90.

The median age in the city was 38.2 years. 24% of residents were under the age of 18; 8.8% were between the ages of 18 and 24; 25.2% were from 25 to 44; 26.2% were from 45 to 64; and 15.8% were 65 years of age or older. The gender makeup of the city was 46.8% male and 53.2% female.

Economy

Kokomo's employment, largely based in manufacturing, was hard hit by the economic downturn which led to the recession beginning in December 2007. In December 2008, Kokomo was ranked third by Forbes in its list of America's fastest dying towns, mainly as a result of the financial difficulties of the automotive industry.

In May 2011, Forbes magazine listed Kokomo as one of the "Best Cities for Jobs" after the city ascended 177 places in the rankings. The same article described Kokomo's success in the past few years as "inspirational" and attributed the turnaround to "a revival in manufacturing." In June 2011, Conexus released a report touting Kokomo's "rapid bounce" after the recession, and predicted a rise in income of more than 2%, assuming increased automobile production.

By May 2013 Kokomo's unemployment rate was 9%, representing a 1.4% decrease in non-farm employment, it was higher than the national rate of 7.6%. The May 2013 statistics reported a 6.9% decline in manufacturing jobs over the previous 12 months. Government employment was 18.7% below the previous year.

Major employers are
 Chrysler Division of Stellantis
Kokomo Transmission Plant (3,583 employees)
 Kokomo Casting Plant (1,281 employees)
 Indiana Transmission Plant I and II (2,439 employees)
 Kokomo Engine Plant started production in 2022.
 BorgWarner
 GM Components Holdings LLC
 Haynes International
 Holder Mattress
 Syndicate Sales, Inc.
 Coca-Cola bottling plant
 Bona Vista (charity)

Arts and culture

Howard County Historical Society

The Howard County Historical Society occupies the Seiberling Mansion and the Elliot House, and their carriage houses. The Seiberling Mansion was built as the residence of Monroe Seiberling, one of Kokomo's richest citizens. Because of its architectural significance, the building has been listed on the National Register of Historic Places since 1972. The Elliot House was also built as a residence; it was later adapted for use as office space. These buildings are in the Old Silk Stocking Neighborhood, which is on the National Register of Historic Places, the only neighborhood in the county to be so recognized.

Historic Buildings in Kokomo, Indiana

The following is a list of all the buildings in Kokomo, Indiana, that are listed in the National Register of Historic Places:
Elwood Haynes House
Kokomo City Building
Kokomo Country Club Golf Course
Kokomo Courthouse Square Historic District
Kokomo High School and Memorial Gymnasium
Lake Erie and Western Depot Historic District
Learner Building
Old Silk Stocking Historic District
Seiberling Mansion

Festivals 
 Haynes-Apperson Festival, Independence Day weekend
 WeberFest, Foster Park
 Kokomo Con, October, Kokomo Event Center.

Sports teams

Other current teams include the City of First Roller Girls (Founded 2010) who compete in the Women's Flat Track Derby Association (WFTDA). Indiana University of Kokomo Cougars compete in 12 sports within the NAIA in the River States Conference (RSC).

Former teams
 Indiana Mustangs, Mid Continental Football League (1991–2009), Mid States Football League (2010-2013)
 Kokomo Dodgers, Midwest League (1955–1961)
 Kokomo CFD Saints, semi-pro baseball (1989–2002)
 Kokomo CFD Knights, semi-pro baseball (2006–2007)
 Kokomo Mantis FC, soccer team (2016)

Sports venues
 Highland Park Stadium (CFD Investments Stadium)
 Kokomo Speedway
 Memorial Gymnasium
 Kokomo Municipal Stadium
 Wildcat Creek Soccer Complex
 Student Activities and Events Center

Parks and recreation

 Chief Ma-Ko-Ko-Mo Burial and Monument, east of downtown Kokomo
 Elwood Haynes Museum, located next to Highland Park
 Foster Park
 Kokomo Country Club, golf club

Trails and paths
The trail connects several of Kokomo's parks including Foster, Future, Waterworks, Miller-Highland and Mehlig Parks with a pedestrian bridge connecting Foster Park and the Kokomo Beach Family Aquatic Center.
 Industrial Heritage Trail – The Industrial Heritage Trail spans  from SR931 on the city's south side and connects with the Nickel Plate Trail on the city's north side.
 Nickel Plate Trail – Currently connecting Rochester through Peru, to Kokomo and connecting with the Industrial Heritage Trail.
 The Cloverleaf Trail - This trail was added in 2018. It starts downtown and travels southwest along what was once part of the Toledo, St. Louis and Western Railroad.

Government

Kokomo's current mayor is Republican Tyler Moore, elected in November 2019. The previous mayor was Democrat Greg Goodnight (2008–2019) The two previous mayors before Goodnight were Matt McKillip (2004–2008) and Jim Trobaugh, both Republicans.
The mayor is elected in a citywide vote. The city council is known as the Common Council. It consists of nine members. Six members are elected from individual districts. The other three are elected at-large.

Education
Colleges and universities
 Howard College - 1863-1872
 Indiana University Kokomo (IUK)
 Indiana Wesleyan University – Kokomo Campus
 Ivy Tech Community College
 Purdue University College of Technology at Kokomo

Public school districts
 Kokomo-Center Township Consolidated School Corporation (K-12, most neighborhoods inside city limits) Kokomo High School (NCC)
 Northwestern School Corporation (K–12, northern part of the town) (MIC)
 Taylor Community School Corporation (K-12, Indian Heights neighborhood) (MIC)
 Western School Corporation (K-12, Pine Valley/Jackson Morrow Park area) (MIC)

Private schools
 Acacia Academy (K-8)
 Agape Garden Montessori School
 Children's Christian Academy
 Christian Heritage Academy
 F.D. Reese Christian Academy (K-3)
 Redeemer Lutheran School (K-8)
 Sts. Joan of Arc and St. Patrick Catholic School (K-8)
 Temple Christian School (K-12)
 Victory Christian Academy (K-12)

Public library
The city has a lending library, the Kokomo-Howard County Public Library.

Media
Newspapers
 Kokomo Tribune, daily morning newspaper owned by Community Newspaper Holdings
 Kokomo Perspective, a locally owned weekly newspaper delivered every Tuesday or Wednesday that ceased publication in late 2021
 The Correspondent, student newspaper of Indiana University Kokomo and Purdue College of Technology at Kokomo
 The Kokomo Post, an online media publication owned by the Larison Company LLC

Television
 WTTK, CBS affiliate, channel 29 (satellite of Bloomington-licensed WTTV); transmits from Indianapolis's north side
 KGOV, Kokomo government access channel, channel 2

Radio
 WFIU-FM, Jazz, Classical, NPR – 106.1 FM
 WFRN-FM, Christian Radio – 93.7 FM
 WIOU-AM, Talk, News and Sports – 1350 AM
 WIWC-FM, Christian Radio – 91.7 FM
 WMYK-FM, Rock – 98.5 FM
 WSHW-FM, Contemporary Hit Radio (Top 40) – 99.7 FM
 WTSX-FM, Hip-Hop, Gospel, Soul, Rock-n-Roll, EDM & Top 40 - 104.9 FM
 WWKI-FM, Hit Country – 100.5 FM
 WJJD-LP, Christian Radio, Radio 74 – 101.3 FM
 WZWZ-FM, Bright Adult Contemporary – 92.5 FM

Infrastructure

Transportation
Airports
 Kokomo Municipal Airport

Highways

  US-31 to South Bend (North) and Indianapolis (South)
  US-35 to Logansport (North) and Muncie (South)
  IN-931 (former US 31 through Kokomo)
  IN-19 to Kokomo Reservoir (North) and Tipton (South)
  IN-22 to Burlington (West) and Hartford City (East)
  IN-26 to Lafayette (West) and Hartford City (East)

A major roadway traversing through Kokomo, nicknamed "stop light city", US 31 had become one of the state's most congested roadways. In Howard County, there were 15 traffic signals on US 31. As part of the state of Indiana's Major Moves Project, US 31 was updated to bypass the city of Kokomo to the east. It has interchanges at SR 26, Boulevard, Markland Avenue, and Touby Pike, as well as where the current SR 931 meets the new US 31. There was a similar change near South Bend and there will be one near Indianapolis. The construction in Howard County cost roughly $340 million. Construction started on the County Road 200 South bridge on November 1, 2008. The new US 31 was opened November 27, 2013, at which time the existing roadway was renamed SR 931.

Railroads
 Central Railroad of Indianapolis
 Winamac Southern Railway (formerly part of the Columbus to Chicago Main Line)

The town for many years was a stop on the Pennsylvania Railroad's division running on a Chicago-Logansport-Richmond-Hamilton-Cincinnati itinerary. The last named train on the route was the overnight Buckeye, whose unnamed successor ended service in 1969.Christopher T. Baer, 'Named Trains of the PRR, including Through Trains, September 8, 2009, p. 9 A day train counterpart on the route lingered on at least another year.

Bus service
 Trailways service to Indianapolis and South Bend
 Kokomo City-Line Trolley A fixed-route transportation system, five bus routes run past a total of exactly 275 stops, passing each stop once every hour, from 6:30 a.m. to 7 p.m., Monday through Friday. The buses also have wireless internet for riders, which like the buses, is free to riders.

 Groundwater contamination 
In 1995 the Indiana American Water treatment facility found groundwater beneath the city contaminated with trace amounts of vinyl chloride. In 2007, the Indiana Department of Environmental Management found groundwater at four municipal wells containing vinyl chloride at levels exceeding the EPA maximum contaminant level in raw water.

In 2011, it found one of the monitoring wells, not owned or used by Indiana American Water, had amounts of vinyl chloride that were more than 2,500 times the maximum level for drinking water. IDEM has identified fourteen facilities that handle chlorinated solvents and could be sources to the contamination plume. Some of these potential sources are currently being managed under other authorities but there is no cleanup approach focusing on the ground water plume. Water from several well fields in Kokomo are blended and treated prior to distribution. A water treatment system has been successfully removing the vinyl chloride from the finished drinking water, but this is not a permanent solution to address the contaminated ground water plume.

The site was proposed to the National Priorities List and added to the Superfund in March 2015. No cleanup plan is yet in effect.

Health care
 Ascension St. Vincent Kokomo, opened in 1913 part of Ascension (healthcare system).
 Community Howard Regional Health, incorporated in 1958

Entertainment
Kokomo has a 12-screen movie theater, called AMC Showplace Kokomo 12, located on 1530 East Boulevard. In addition to AMC, Kokomo also has several forms of live entertainment, including choirs, a Park Band Association, and three live theatres.

Shopping
The city's major mall is Markland Mall, which features Target. The Kokomo Town Center, the former Kokomo Mall, underwent a major renovation in 2011 when it became an outdoor mall.

Neighborhoods
These are neighborhoods in Kokomo according to the city transportation map:

Notable people

.

 Brandon Beachy, MLB pitcher Los Angeles Dodgers, Northwestern High School (Indiana) graduate
 Alicia Berneche, operatic soprano
 Rupert Boneham, contestant on TV series Survivor, Libertarian candidate for Indiana Governor in 2012
 Norman Bridwell, author of the Clifford the Big Red Dog children's books
 Quautico (Tico) Brown, former Continental Basketball Association player
 Steve Butler, six-time Sprint Car National Champion
 Kaitlyn Christopher, Miss Indiana USA 2005
 Dave Darland, auto racer
 Rowdy Elliott, baseball player
 Elwood Haynes, inventor, automotive pioneer
 Bud Hillis, U.S. Representative
 Margaret Hillis, pianist, founder of Chicago Symphony Chorus
 Nellie Keeler, child circus performer
 Honorée Fanonne Jeffers, Author of The Love Songs of W.E.B. Du Bois and The Age of Phillis Don Johnson, professional bowler, PBA Hall of Fame member
 Opha May Johnson, United States Marine Corps first female Marine
 Steve Kroft, 60 Minutes correspondent
 Jim "Goose" Ligon, former ABA basketball player
 Strother Martin, actor
 Clay Myers, photographer, animal welfare advocate
 Kent C. Nelson, past CEO of United Parcel Service
 John O'Banion, singer
 Jack Purvis, jazz musician
 Jane Randolph, actress, grew up in Kokomo
 Jimmy Rayl, "Splendid Splinter," Indiana Pacers 1967–1969, two-time All-American Indiana University
 Robert S. Richardson, astronomer
 Tod Sloan, jockey
 Tavis Smiley, PBS presenter
 "Sylvia" (Sylvia Jane Kirby), country music singer
 Joe Thatcher, pitcher for MLB  Chicago Cubs
 Pat Underwood, former MLB pitcher, Detroit Tigers
 Tom Underwood, former MLB pitcher, Philadelphia Phillies, St. Louis Cardinals, Toronto Blue Jays, New York Yankees, Oakland A's and Baltimore Orioles
 William N. Vaile, Congressman
 Gertrude Vaile (1878-1954), social worker
 Ryan White, AIDS activist
 Anna Mae Winburn,  African American vocalist and jazz bandleader best known for having directed the International Sweethearts of Rhythm

In popular culture

 The Man from Home (1908), a play by Booth Tarkington and Harry Leon Wilson, involves a lawyer from Kokomo who travels to Europe but returns to the city in the end.
 A Romance of Kokomo was a silent film made in 1917, which was also filmed in Kokomo, and made its opening premiere at the Isis Theater on South Main Street.
 The Kid from Kokomo (1939; also sometimes called Broadway Cavalier) is a comedy film about an orphan from Kokomo who refuses to box until his mother is found. The film was based on a story by Dalton Trumbo.
Kokomo is mentioned in the 1943 song Hot Time in the Town of Berlin first recorded by Bing Crosby and the Andrews Sisters in 1944.
 In the 1947 film Mother Wore Tights, Betty Grable and Dan Dailey sing a song entitled "Kokomo, Indiana".
 Kokomo is the setting of Allan Dwan's nostalgic 1953 musical Sweethearts on Parade.
"First Snow in Kokomo" is a track on Aretha Franklin's album Young, Gifted and Black. Franklin's domestic partner Ken Cunningham was born and raised in Kokomo and they still have family there.
 In the 1980 film Blues Brothers, the roadhouse "Bob's Country Bunker" is identified by Elwood Blues as being located in Kokomo.
 In the 1997 animated film Cats Don't Dance'', the main protagonist Danny is from Kokomo.
In craps, rolling a four is sometimes referred to as "Little Joe from Kokomo", after "little" Joe Fohn, a famous bowler in the 1920s  who apparently had a four step delivery.
The city is the title of a song from singer Japanese Breakfast's 2021 album Jubilee.

Sister city
  Dongyang, Zhejiang, China (2013)

See also

 National Register of Historic Places listings in Howard County, Indiana

References

Bibliography

External links

 
 City of Kokomo

 
1844 establishments in Indiana
Cities in Howard County, Indiana
Cities in Indiana
County seats in Indiana
Kokomo, Indiana metropolitan area
Populated places established in 1844